Thomas Meredith (after 1666 – 11 July 1701) was an English Whig politician who sat in the House of Commons of England in 1701.

Thomas Meredith was the son of Sir Richard Meredith, 2nd Baronet, of Leeds Abbey, Kent, and his wife Susanna, daughter of Philip Skippon. He was educated at Trinity Hall, Cambridge and entered Inner Temple in 1683. In 1689 he became a J.P. for Kent.

Meredith was elected Member of Parliament (MP) for Kent in an uncontested election in January 1701. He was a Whig and presented the Kentish Petition to the house in March. Although apparently in good health, he sickened when he went to the country during the recess in August and died in London.

References

1701 deaths
English MPs 1701
Younger sons of baronets
Year of birth uncertain
Alumni of Trinity Hall, Cambridge
Members of the Inner Temple
People from Leeds, Kent